The Marshall Thundering Herd men's soccer team is a varsity intercollegiate athletic team of Marshall University in Huntington, West Virginia. The Thundering Herd plays its home games at Veterans Memorial Soccer Complex in Huntington and competes in the National Collegiate Athletic Association Division I Sun Belt Conference (SBC). Marshall fielded its first intercollegiate men's soccer team in 1979. The Herd are coached by Chris Grassie, who has a record of 67–32–18  and a national championship during his six previous seasons at Marshall.

Seasons

2020 season 

In 2020, the Marshall Men's soccer team, coached by Chris Grassie, broke several records and made a historic run in the 2020 NCAA Division I Men's Soccer Tournament. After winning the Conference USA Regular Season championship, they received an automatic bid to the 2020 NCAA Men's Soccer Tournament. The team was unseeded going into the tournament; however, they beat #23 ranked Fordham University in the second round, upset #1 seed Clemson in the third round, beat defending national champions and #8 seed Georgetown in the quarterfinals, and beat North Carolina in the College Cup semifinals. The season was capped off with a OT golden goal win over #3 seed Indiana in the College Cup final, giving Marshall its first-ever NCAA Division I National Championship in men's soccer. It was also Conference USA's first-ever national championship in any team sport.

Individual achievements

All-Americans 
 Pedro Dolabella - 2021 United Soccer Coaches Second Team
 Vitor Dias - 2020 Consensus All-American First Team, 2021 United Soccer Coaches Third Team
 Nathan Dossantos - 2020 Top Drawer Soccer Third Team
 Milo Yosef - 2019 United Soccer Coaches Second Team, 2019 Soccer America Second Team, 2022 United Soccer Coaches Second Team

Conference Players of the Year

Career goalscorers 

Bryon Carmichael leads Marshall's goalscoring record, scoring 58 career goals.

Former Herd players in the professional ranks

References 
General
 
 
 
 
Footnotes

External links 
 

 
1979 establishments in West Virginia
Association football clubs established in 1979